Crystal Spring Steam Pumping Station, also known as the Crystal Spring and Great Spring, is a historic pumping station located at Roanoke, Virginia.  It was built in 1905, and is a one-story, common-bond brick structure, measuring 58 feet in length and 30 feet in width.  The building houses a Corliss-type pump made by the Snow Pump Co. in Buffalo, New York, with a 5,000,000 gallon daily pumping capacity.  The pump was in operation from 1905 to 1957.

It was listed on the National Register of Historic Places in 1980.

References

Industrial buildings and structures on the National Register of Historic Places in Virginia
Buildings and structures completed in 1905
Buildings and structures in Roanoke, Virginia
National Register of Historic Places in Roanoke, Virginia
Water supply pumping stations on the National Register of Historic Places
1905 establishments in Virginia